"Som stormen river öppet hav" is a song written by Susanne Alfvengren and Ulf Wahlberg, and recorded as a duet by Susanne Alfvengren and Mikael Rickfors. It was released as a single in 1986 for the 1987 Swedish film A Film About Love, with the song "Om kärlek" as the B-side. The single peaked at number three on the Swedish Singles Chart. It also charted at Svensktoppen for 29 weeks between 25 January to 25 October 1987.

Other recordings 
In 2002, the song was recorded by Jeanette Köhn and Loa Falkman on the album Det vackraste and in 2005 by Munkarna on the album 1:a kapitlet.

The song has also been recorded in other languages, a 2006 Shonentai version in Japanese was recorded for a musical.

Charts

References

1986 songs
1986 singles
Susanne Alfvengren songs
Swedish-language songs
Male–female vocal duets